Bonifacio Ávila (born June 5, 1950) is a retired boxer from Colombia, who represented his native country at the 1972 Summer Olympics. There he was eliminated in the second round of the men's light middleweight division (– 71 kg) by eventual gold medalist Dieter Kottysch from West Germany. Avila turned pro on April 6, 1973, and retired in 1979 after 28 bouts (17 wins, 8 losses and 3 draws).

Olympic results
1st round bye
Lost to Dieter Kottysch (West Germany) TKO by 2

Professional boxing record

|-
|align="center" colspan=8|17 Wins (14 knockouts, 3 decisions), 9 Losses (7 knockouts, 2 decisions), 3 Draws 
|-
| align="center" style="border-style: none none solid solid; background: #e3e3e3"|Result
| align="center" style="border-style: none none solid solid; background: #e3e3e3"|Record
| align="center" style="border-style: none none solid solid; background: #e3e3e3"|Opponent
| align="center" style="border-style: none none solid solid; background: #e3e3e3"|Type
| align="center" style="border-style: none none solid solid; background: #e3e3e3"|Round
| align="center" style="border-style: none none solid solid; background: #e3e3e3"|Date
| align="center" style="border-style: none none solid solid; background: #e3e3e3"|Location
| align="center" style="border-style: none none solid solid; background: #e3e3e3"|Notes
|-align=center
|Loss
|
|align=left| Jean-Claude LeClair
|KO
|4
|21/08/1979
|align=left| Montreal, Quebec, Canada
|align=left|
|-
|Loss
|
|align=left| Eddie Melo
|TKO
|6
|25/05/1979
|align=left| Montreal, Quebec, Canada
|align=left|
|-
|Loss
|
|align=left| Carlos De Leon
|TKO
|2
|27/01/1979
|align=left| San Juan, Puerto Rico, U.S.
|align=left|
|-
|Loss
|
|align=left| Alfredo Horacio Cabral
|PTS
|10
|11/11/1978
|align=left| Buenos Aires, Argentina
|align=left|
|-
|Loss
|
|align=left| Elijah Makathini
|PTS
|10
|10/10/1978
|align=left| Durban, South Africa
|align=left|
|-
|Win
|
|align=left| Roy "Smoky" Edmonds
|KO
|6
|06/06/1978
|align=left| Montreal, Quebec, Canada
|align=left|
|-
|Loss
|
|align=left| Bob "Hunter" Patterson
|TKO
|10
|21/02/1978
|align=left| Montreal, Quebec, Canada
|align=left|
|-
|Loss
|
|align=left| Ayub Kalule
|TKO
|4
|05/01/1978
|align=left| Randers, Denmark
|align=left|
|-
|Win
|
|align=left| Carlos Marks
|PTS
|12
|24/07/1977
|align=left| Cartagena, Colombia
|align=left|
|-
|Win
|
|align=left| Don Melosh
|KO
|3
|09/05/1977
|align=left| Quebec City, Canada
|align=left|
|-
|Loss
|
|align=left| Lenny Harden
|TKO
|6
|22/03/1977
|align=left| Montreal, Quebec, Canada
|align=left|
|-
|Win
|
|align=left| JT Dowe
|KO
|4
|22/02/1977
|align=left| Montreal, Quebec, Canada
|align=left|
|-
|Win
|
|align=left| Gary Broughton
|TKO
|8
|09/02/1977
|align=left| Quebec City, Canada
|align=left|
|-
|Win
|
|align=left| Juan Evangelista Cordoba
|KO
|?
|12/12/1976
|align=left| Santa María, Colombia
|align=left|
|-
|Win
|
|align=left| John "The Poll" Harris
|KO
|1
|06/08/1976
|align=left| New York City, U.S.
|align=left|
|-
|Win
|
|align=left| Curtis Phillips
|KO
|5
|26/07/1976
|align=left| New York City, U.S.
|align=left|
|-
|Draw
|
|align=left| Alirio Quinonez
|PTS
|10
|08/10/1975
|align=left| Santa María, Colombia
|align=left|
|-
|Win
|
|align=left| Nelson LaSalle
|TKO
|6
|16/08/1975
|align=left| Cartagena, Colombia
|align=left|
|-
|Draw
|
|align=left| Alirio Quinonez
|PTS
|10
|23/05/1975
|align=left| Medellín, Colombia
|align=left|
|-
|Win
|
|align=left| Juan Evangelista Cordoba
|KO
|7
|12/12/1974
|align=left| Cartagena, Colombia
|align=left|
|-
|Win
|
|align=left| Alirio Quinonez
|PTS
|10
|06/09/1974
|align=left| Bogotá, Colombia
|align=left|
|-
|Loss
|
|align=left| Angel Rodriguez
|KO
|6
|20/06/1974
|align=left| Barranquilla, Colombia
|align=left|
|-
|Win
|
|align=left| Don Lutz
|KO
|1
|16/03/1974
|align=left| Cartagena, Colombia
|align=left|
|-
|Draw
|
|align=left|Felipe Cariaco
|TD
|3
|02/03/1974
|align=left| Cartagena, Colombia
|align=left|
|-
|Win
|
|align=left| "Arc" Angel Rodriguez
|KO
|5
|14/12/1973
|align=left| Bogotá, Colombia
|align=left|
|-
|Win
|
|align=left| Juan Evangelista Cordoba
|TKO
|6
|14/08/1973
|align=left| Cartagena, Colombia
|align=left|
|-
|Win
|
|align=left|Gregorio Arboleda
|PTS
|8
|30/05/1973
|align=left| Bogotá, Colombia
|align=left|
|-
|Win
|
|align=left| Jorge de Avila
|KO
|5
|11/05/1973
|align=left| Cartagena, Colombia
|align=left|
|-
|Win
|
|align=left| Eduardo Hurtado
|KO
|1
|06/04/1973
|align=left| Cartagena, Colombia
|align=left|
|}

References
 

1950 births
Living people
Light-middleweight boxers
Olympic boxers of Colombia
Boxers at the 1972 Summer Olympics
Pan American Games competitors for Colombia
Boxers at the 1971 Pan American Games
Place of birth missing (living people)
Colombian male boxers
20th-century Colombian people